Das zweite Schraube-Fragment is a 1985 Austrian short adventure film directed by Walter Andreas Christen. It was screened in the Un Certain Regard section at the 1986 Cannes Film Festival.

Cast
 Mathias Forberg - Günther Schraube
 Axel Klingenberg - Klingenberg
 Paola Loew - Putzfrau
 Jost Meyer - Pianist
 Justus Neumann - Prof. Neumann
 Ella Peneder - Sopranistin
 Jutta Schwarz - Jutta
 Bruno Thost - Dr. Grabl
 Freyja Wisböck - Hure
 Dieter Witting - Dieter

References

External links

1985 films
1980s adventure films
1985 short films
1980s German-language films
Austrian short films
Austrian adventure films